Geluksoord is a township in close proximity to Christiana in Dr Ruth Segomotsi Mompati District Municipality in the North West province of South Africa.

References

Populated places in the Lekwa-Teemane Local Municipality
Townships in North West (South African province)